Kaylor may refer to:

Kaylor, Pennsylvania
Kaylor, South Dakota